Misurići is a village in the municipality of Maglaj, Bosnia and Herzegovina.

Bosnian singer Šemsa Suljaković lived in the Misurići village for the first few years of her life.

Demographics 
According to the 2013 census, its population was 1,556.

References

Populated places in Maglaj